Lesticus medius is a species of ground beetle in the subfamily Pterostichinae. It was described by Darlington in 1971.

References

Lesticus
Beetles described in 1971